Nackt-Radtour, Karlsruher FKK Rad-Classics and Karlsruher Nacktradeltour are references used to describe annual naked cycling tours in Germany, many of which happen around Karlsruhe. Organizers describe the event as recreational rather than political. Full and partial (especially topfree) nudity is encouraged, but not mandatory, on all rides. The rides are believed to be some of the first naked bike rides organized in the world. The rides are organized by a number of groups and individuals, such as "No Limit Nudism", the action group "Wald FKK", "Free Range Nudism" or FKK-Freun.de. The events are organized via various internet portals. The events have been held annually since 2000, and generally take place in June or July.

See also

Clothing-optional bike rides
Nudity in sport
List of public outdoor clothes free places

References 

Naked cycling events
Annual events in Germany
Clothing-free events
Cycling in Germany
Karlsruhe
Naturism in Germany
Nude recreation